KONO-FM (101.1 MHz) is a commercial radio station licensed to Helotes, Texas and it serves Greater San Antonio. It is owned by Cox Radio and airs a classic hits radio format. Its studios are located in Northwest San Antonio near the South Texas Medical Center complex, and the transmitter site is located in far-north Bexar County, Texas, at the intersection of FM 1560 and Galm Road, Near the McCarter Ranch

KONO-FM features a playlist of hit songs from co-owned KONO (AM)'s long history of Top 40 music from the 1970s and 1980s. Using the slogan "San Antonio's Greatest Hits", KONO-FM’s core artists include The Eagles, The Bee Gees, Michael Jackson, Lionel Richie, Hall and Oates and others with a few songs from the 1960s and the 1990s. During the holiday season, the station goes back to the 1950s through the 1990s for several holiday classics.

History
KONO-FM first signed on the air on February 18, 1971 as KNAF-FM, the sister station to KNAF (AM) in Fredericksburg, Texas. At first it simulcast the country music format on the AM station, but by the mid-1970s it had a separately programmed beautiful music format. It later took the call letters KFAN, as an adult album alternative station. The station then moved to the San Antonio media market as KONO-FM, simulcasting KONO from May 1990 until KONO changed its format to sports radio in January 2014. During that time, KBKK (107.9 FM) in Johnson City started broadcasting KFAN's previous Adult Alternative format. About a year later it acquired the KFAN-FM call sign.

References

External links
 

ONO-FM
Classic hits radio stations in the United States
Cox Media Group
Radio stations established in 1971
1971 establishments in Texas